MyTime is a software company headquartered in San Francisco that provides an all-in-one scheduling, marketing, and point of sale solution for local and International service businesses like Salons, Spa, Therapists, Fitness, Government, Financial and Educational Institutions and ″its Price per breed″ for Pet Groomers and Suppliers for Enterprises and Franchises as well as businesses that have multiple locations. MyTime's Omnichannel Online booking experience can be integrated into clients’ website and mobile apps, as well as Google Search and Google Maps, Bing, Facebook, and Instagram, thereby enabling customers to find, book, and transact with businesses from any place they engage with their brand.

MyTime also owns an online appointment booking website which launched to consumers in 2013.  MyTime allows consumers to view local businesses' availability, and then book and purchase their services online. The types of services offered on MyTime.com include health and beauty, medical and pet based businesses, sports and fitness, among others.  At launch, MyTime had more than 500,000 appointments available for booking.

Background 

MyTime was founded by CEO Ethan Anderson. Prior to starting MyTime, Anderson co-founded Redbeacon and served as their CEO. In 2010, Anderson was named on Business Insider's Silicon Valley 100 list.

Products 
For consumers, MyTime is a searchable marketplace where users can find and book appointments. Users can search by type of service, location, and preferred appointment date and time. MyTime displays available time slots from each business that has a profile on MyTime, and the user books and pays for the appointment online.

Awards 

 Winner of 2014 Local Search Association's Ad to Action Award
 1st Place at LAUNCH Mobile Conference

Investment 

In February 2013, MyTime announced they had raised a seed round of $3M in funding.

Recent News - Hall, Mitzie (30 November 2021) MyTime: The Demand for Modern Payment Methods Pays Off for Businesses by Author : The Fintech Times 

Online marketplaces of the United States

MyTime: The Demand for Modern Payment Methods Pays Off for Businesses